The 1983 NBA World Championship Series, also known as Showdown '83, was the championship round of the National Basketball Association (NBA)'s 1982–83 season, and the culmination of the season's playoffs. It was the last NBA Championship Series completed before June 1. The Eastern Conference champion Philadelphia 76ers defeated the Western Conference champion Los Angeles Lakers 4 games to 0 to win their third NBA championship. 76ers center Moses Malone was named the NBA Finals Most Valuable Player (MVP). This, along with the 1989 NBA Finals, were the only two NBA championships of the 1980s not to be won by either the Lakers or the Boston Celtics; every NBA Finals of that decade featured either the Lakers or Celtics, and sometimes both (1984, 1985, 1987). Coincidentally, the Lakers were also swept in the 1989 NBA Finals, that time by the Detroit Pistons.

Background

Philadelphia 76ers

While Julius Erving played superbly in both series, their frontcourt of Darryl Dawkins, Caldwell Jones, and Bobby Jones couldn't neutralize Kareem Abdul-Jabbar. So in the off-season, the 76ers acquired Moses Malone from the Houston Rockets in an effort to counter Abdul-Jabbar, in addition to providing some offense and rebounding to the team. They parted ways with Caldwell Jones, Dawkins, and Lionel Hollins before the season, while giving greater responsibility to high-scoring guard Andrew Toney and backup playmaker Clint Richardson, and adding forwards Clemon Johnson and rookie Marc Iavaroni.

Malone's acquisition paid dividends, as the 76ers won 65 games in the 1982–83 NBA season. Prior to the playoffs, Malone predicted the team would win in four games in each of the three rounds, ending it with the statement Fo, Fo, Fo. The 76ers would steamroll through the playoffs, sweeping the New York Knicks 4–0 in the conference semifinals, before overcoming the Milwaukee Bucks in five games.

Los Angeles Lakers

The Lakers earned the top pick of the 1982 NBA draft, becoming the only defending champion to earn the top overall pick in the same season. This was because Cleveland Cavaliers owner Ted Stepien traded their first round pick and Butch Lee to the Lakers for Don Ford and draft pick Chad Kinch three years earlier. Because the Cavaliers earned the worst record at 15–67, they would have earned the top overall pick via a coin toss with the 17–65 San Diego Clippers. Instead, the Lakers would earn the top pick and ultimately selected future Hall of Famer James Worthy first overall.

The Lakers won 58 games the next season. Worthy was a strong contender for Rookie of the Year when he broke his leg late in the season, therefore missing the rest of the season and the playoffs. Despite Worthy's absence, Magic Johnson and Kareem Abdul-Jabbar were still in their prime, and led the Lakers back to the Finals by beating the Portland Trail Blazers 4–1 and the San Antonio Spurs 4–2 in the second and third playoff rounds, respectively.

Road to the Finals

Regular season series
The Philadelphia 76ers won both games in the regular season series:

Series summary

The final piece of the Philadelphia 76ers' championship puzzle was completed before the 1982–83 season when they acquired center Moses Malone from the Houston Rockets. They went on to capture their historic second NBA championship as they won 65 games, and stormed through the playoffs, first sweeping the New York Knicks, and then beating the Milwaukee Bucks in five games. They finally finished it off with a four-game sweep of the Los Angeles Lakers, who had defeated them the season before.

Said head coach Billy Cunningham, "The difference from last year was Moses." Malone was named MVP of the 1983 Finals, as well as league MVP for the third time in his career. The 76ers completed one of the most dominating playoff runs in league history with a 12–1 mark after league and NBA Finals MVP Moses promised "Fo', fo', fo" (as in "four, four, four"—four wins to win round 1, four wins to win round 2, etc.), but it actually wound up as "Fo', fi', fo." (four, five, four). The 76ers were also led by Julius Erving, Maurice Cheeks, Andrew Toney, and Bobby Jones.

With 59 seconds to go in Game 4, it was Erving who made a three-point play to hold the lead for good, crushing the Lakers in a four-game sweep and ending the last NBA Finals to end before June.

Until the Phillies won the 2008 World Series over the Tampa Bay Rays in a 4-1 sweep, this was the last time for 25 years that a team from Philadelphia in the Big Four leagues won their league's championship.

Game 1

Game 2

Game 3

Game 4

Player statistics

Philadelphia 76ers

|-
| align="left" |  || 4 || 4 || 36.8 || .423 || .000 || .848 || 2.3 || 5.8 || 1.3 || 0.3 || 22.0 
|-! style="background:#FDE910;"
| align="left" |  || 4 || 4 || 39.3 || .507 || .000 || .660 || 18.0 || 2.0 || 1.5 || 1.5 || 25.8 
|-
| align="left" |  || 4 || 4 || 35.8 || .553 || .000 || .600 || 2.3 || 6.3 || 2.8 || 0.0 || 15.3 
|-
| align="left" |  || 4 || 0 || 26.0 || .568 || .000 || .667 || 4.8 || 2.8 || 2.0 || 2.3 || 12.0 
|-
| align="left" |  || 4 || 4 || 24.8 || .588 || .000 || .375 || 5.5 || 2.0 || 0.3 || 0.8 || 5.8 
|-
| align="left" |  || 4 || 4 || 38.3 || .469 || .000 || .800 || 8.5 || 5.0 || 1.3 || 2.8 || 19.0 
|-
| align="left" |  || 4 || 0 || 23.0 || .393 || .000 || .750 || 3.3 || 1.8 || 1.3 || 0.3 || 6.3 
|-
| align="left" |  || 3 || 0 || 12.7 || .385 || .000 || .000 || 3.0 || 0.3 || 0.3 || 0.3 || 3.3 
|-
| align="left" |  || 3 || 0 || 6.3 || .333 || .000 || .000 || 1.0 || 0.3 || 0.7 || 0.0 || 0.7 
|-
| align="left" |  || 1 || 0 || 1.0 || 1.000 || .000 || .000 || 0.0 || 0.0 || 0.0 || 0.0 || 4.0 
|-
| align="left" |  || 1 || 0 || 1.0 || .000 || .000 || .000 || 0.0 || 0.0 || 0.0 || 0.0 || 0.0 
|-
| align="left" |  || 3 || 0 || 1.0 || .000 || .000 || 1.000 || 0.3 || 0.0 || 0.0 || 0.0 || 0.7 

Los Angeles Lakers

|-
| align="left" |  || 2 || 0 || 21.0 || .409 || .500 || 1.000 || 7.0 || 0.5 || 2.5 || 1.0 || 11.0 
|-
| align="left" |  || 4 || 4 || 38.8 || .552 || .000 || .769 || 7.5 || 3.0 || 0.8 || 2.3 || 23.5
|-
| align="left" |  || 4 || 4 || 39.3 || .461 || .000 || .571 || 5.8 || 1.8 || 2.0 || 1.3 || 18.5 
|-
| align="left" |  || 3 || 3 || 36.7 || .405 || .000 || .636 || 2.7 || 4.7 || 1.3 || 0.3 || 13.7 
|-
| align="left" |  || 4 || 1 || 31.5 || .486 || .333 || .833 || 3.5 || 1.8 || 1.5 || 0.3 || 10.0 
|-
| align="left" |  || 4 || 4 || 21.3 || .480 || .000 || .778 || 4.5 || 0.8 || 0.5 || 1.5 || 7.8 
|-
| align="left" |  || 4 || 0 || 14.0 || .400 || .000 || 1.000 || 5.0 || 0.5 || 0.0 || 0.5 || 2.5 
|-
| align="left" |  || 4 || 4 || 44.8 || .408 || .000 || .929 || 7.8 || 12.5 || 1.8 || 0.5 || 19.0 
|-
| align="left" |  || 3 || 0 || 4.0 || .600 || .000 || .000 || 0.7 || 0.3 || 0.3 || 0.3 || 2.0 
|-
| align="left" |  || 2 || 0 || 10.0 || .333 || .000 || .000 || 3.5 || 0.5 || 0.0 || 0.0 || 3.0 
|-
| align="left" |  || 2 || 0 || 8.5|| .125 || .000 || .000 || 2.0 || 0.0 || 0.0 || 0.0 || 1.0 
|-
| align="left" |  || 1 || 0 || 1.0 || .000 || .000 || .000 || 0.0 || 0.0 || 0.0 || 0.0 || 0.0

Television coverage
The 1983 NBA Finals was broadcast by CBS. Dick Stockton and Bill Russell were the commentators and Brent Musburger was the host, with Kevin Loughery as a pre-game, halftime and post-game analyst. It also introduced a new theme music (composed by  Allyson Bellink) for the CBS Sports coverage of the NBA, used an introduction of the NBA arenas (similar to the Boston Garden) until the 1989 Playoffs and later revived the second theme beginning in the 1989 Finals.

Russell departed CBS following the series, and was replaced by former Celtics teammate Tom Heinsohn. Russell would later resurface as a color analyst on TBS until 1986.

Team rosters

Philadelphia 76ers

Los Angeles Lakers

See also
 1983 NBA Playoffs

References

External links
NBA History

National Basketball Association Finals
Finals
NBA
NBA
20th century in Los Angeles County, California
NBA Finals
1980s in Philadelphia
NBA Finals
Basketball competitions in Philadelphia
Basketball competitions in Inglewood, California
NBA Finals